Hyperthaema hoffmannsi is a moth of the subfamily Arctiinae. It was described by Rothschild in 1909. It is found in Brazil and French Guiana.

References

 

Phaegopterina
Moths described in 1909